Peter Pan syndrome is a pop-psychology term used to describe an adult who is socially immature. It is a metaphor, based on the concept of not growing up and being trapped in childhood. It is not a recognized mental health illness. The term has been used informally by both laypeople and some psychology professionals since the 1983 publication of The Peter Pan Syndrome: Men Who Have Never Grown Up, by Dr. Dan Kiley.  Kiley also wrote a companion book, The Wendy Dilemma, published in 1984. Peter Pan Syndrome is not recognized by the World Health Organization and is not listed in the Diagnostic and Statistical Manual of Mental Disorders (DSM-5).

People who exhibit characteristics popularly associated with the Peter Pan syndrome have sometimes been referred to disparagingly as Peter Panners. Distinctions have been made with puer aeternus, a psychological concept advanced by Carl Jung.

History
The concept gained popularity through psychoanalyst Dr. Dan Kiley in his book The Peter Pan Syndrome: Men Who Have Never Grown Up first published in 1983. His book became an international best seller and led to a wave of copycat pop-psychology books. Dr. Kiley got the idea for "The Peter Pan Syndrome" after noticing that, like the famous character in the J. M. Barrie play, many of the troubled teenage boys he treated had problems growing up and accepting adult responsibilities. This trouble continued on into adulthood. Dr. Kiley later admitted that he had been a Peter Pan himself.

Island (1962) 
Prior to Kiley coining the term in his 1983 book, Peter Pan syndrome is evident in Aldous Huxley's 1962 novel Island, in which one of the characters talks about male "dangerous delinquents" and "power-loving troublemakers" who are "Peter Pans." These types of males were "boys who can't read, won't learn, don't get on with anyone, and finally turn to the more violent forms of delinquency." He uses Adolf Hitler as an archetype of this phenomenon:

Real-world example 
A prominent example of a celebrity with Peter Pan syndrome was alleged to be Michael Jackson, who said, "I am Peter Pan in my heart." Jackson named the  Los Olivos, California property, where he lived from 1988 to 2005, Neverland Ranch after Neverland, the fantasy island on which Peter Pan lives. He said that it was his way of claiming a childhood he never had, having started early as a performing artist with his family. He had built there numerous statues of children, a floral clock, a petting zoo, a movie theater, and a private amusement park containing cotton candy stands, two railroads, a Ferris wheel, carousel, Zipper, Octopus, Pirate Ship, Wave Swinger, Super Slide, roller coaster, go-karts, bumper cars, a tipi village, and an amusement arcade.

As The New York Daily News staff writer, Carrie Milago, reported on 26 June 2009: "On Jackson's dime, thousands of schoolchildren visited over the years, from local kids to sick youngsters from far away." Visitors "often recalled it as dreamlike," she observed. A preschool teacher visiting the site told USA Today in 2003, Neverland "smells like cinnamon rolls, vanilla and candy and sounds like children laughing."

See also

Boomerang Generation
Dorian Gray syndrome
Puer aeternus

References

Youth
Analytical psychology
Syndrome